WSUV-LP was a Religious formatted broadcast radio station formerly licensed to Susan, Virginia, serving Southeastern Mathews County, Virginia. WSUV-LP was owned and operated by Antioch Baptist Church.

The station surrendered its license to cover to the Federal Communications Commission on December 15, 2010, and the license was cancelled on January 12, 2011.

References

External links
 

SUV-LP
SUV-LP
Defunct radio stations in the United States
Radio stations established in 2004
Defunct religious radio stations in the United States
Radio stations disestablished in 2011
2004 establishments in Virginia
2011 disestablishments in Virginia
SUV-LP